Ko Pot (born 19 May 1958) is a Dutch former professional footballer who played as a defender.

Career
Born in Amsterdam, Pot played in the Netherlands and the United States for DWS, Fort Lauderdale Strikers and FC Den Haag. With the Fort Lauderdale Strikers he was a Soccer Bowl '80 runner up. In the United States he was named John Pot.

References

1958 births
Living people
Dutch footballers
Footballers from Amsterdam
Dutch expatriate footballers
Expatriate soccer players in the United States
Dutch expatriate sportspeople in the United States
Association football defenders
Eerste Divisie players
AFC DWS players
ADO Den Haag players
Fort Lauderdale Strikers (1977–1983) players
North American Soccer League (1968–1984) players